Dorothy Norwood (born May 29, 1935) is an American gospel singer and songwriter. She began touring with her family at the age of eight, and in 1956, began singing with Mahalia Jackson. In the early 1960s she was a member of The Caravans, and in 1964, she embarked on a solo career, recording her first album, Johnny and Jesus. Her 1991 album Live with the Northern California GMWA Mass Choir reached the Number 1 position on Billboard′s Top Forty.

References
Dorothy Norwood
Info Update at Malaco Records 'Last Soul Company' blogsite

External links
Dorothy Norwood bio at Artist Direct website
Dorothy Norwood's Official website
Norwood at Allmusic.com

1935 births
Living people
Writers from Atlanta
American gospel singers
Musicians from Atlanta
African-American Christians
20th-century African-American women singers
21st-century American singers
20th-century American singers
20th-century American women singers
21st-century American women singers
21st-century African-American women singers